The Maisonettes were an English pop band formed by Laurence "Lol" Mason (formerly of City Boy) with Mark Tibenham and drummer Nick Parry, best known for their hit single "Heartache Avenue".

History
The group's debut single, "Heartache Avenue", reached number 7 on the UK Singles Chart in early 1983, topped the UK Independent Chart, and later peaked at number 12 on the Canadian chart and number 97 in Australia. The band's demo was picked up by David Virr, who released "Heartache Avenue" on his own Ready Steady Go! label. The single had been recorded with session backing singers, but to promote the single, they recruited models Denise Ward and Elaine Williams, although these two were later replaced by Carla Mendonça and Elisa Backer (née Richards)

The follow-up single, "Where I Stand", peaked at number 28 on the UK Independent Chart.

In 1984 their album, Maisonettes for Sale, was released in Canada, including "Heartache Avenue" and ten other songs. With no further hits, the group soon disbanded.

"Heartache Avenue" was later sampled by UK rap group Roll Deep, for the chorus on their UK number 11 hit, "The Avenue".

In 2004, Heartache Avenue: The Very Best of the Maisonettes was released in the UK by Cherry Red records, containing two unreleased tracks, the original "Heartache Avenue" and a remix, and fifteen other songs.

On 31 July 2019, Laurence "Lol" Edward Mason died at the age of 69 in his home in Harborne from a heart attack, after complications following a kidney transplant.

Discography

Albums
Maisonettes for Sale (Ready Steady Go!, 1983)

Compilations
Heartache Avenue: The Very Best of the Maisonettes (Cherry Red, 2004)

Singles

References

External links
 
 
 
 

English pop music groups
English new wave musical groups
Musical groups from Birmingham, West Midlands